Sklifosovsky is a Russian medical drama television series starring Maksim Averin. The series is about the employees of the Nikolai Vasilich-Sklifosovsky Emergency Research Institute. The series premiered on September 24, 2012 on Russia-1.

Plot
The series is set against the backdrop of the legendary Nikolai Vasilich-Sklifosovsky Emergency Research Institute. It is dedicated to the complex, dramatic, partly heroic daily life of the famous "Sklif" doctors. Every day the doctors of the Sklifosovsky Research Institute have to make decisions on which human life depends. There are no scheduled patients, long consultations, time to prepare for surgery. It is necessary to act quickly, because every lost minute can cost the patient's life.

At the center of the story is the star of the hospital, a brilliant surgeon, ironically cynical, obsessive doctor Oleg Bragin, devoted to his work. No complicated surgery is possible without his participation. He is not used to standing back or retreating in the face of adversity. Everyone knows that even in the most dangerous situations, he never gets depressed, does not leave the operating table, until a person's life is safe. However, not everything in Oleg Bragin's life is as smooth as it may seem at first glance. Every day of the hero is another battlefield for another's life.

Cast

References

External links
Official website - Russia 1

 

2010s Russian television series
2020s Russian television series
2010 Russian television series debuts
Russian medical television series
Russian workplace drama television series
Russian drama television series